United States v. Wise, 370 U.S. 405 (1962), was a case in which the Supreme Court of the United States held that corporate officers acting in their duties could be subject to sanctions under the Sherman Antitrust Act.

References

External links
 

1962 in United States case law
United States Supreme Court cases
United States Supreme Court cases of the Warren Court
United States antitrust case law
United States Supreme Court criminal cases